The Women's 10,000 metres at the 2011 World Championships in Athletics was held at the Daegu Stadium on August 27.

Kenya entered a strong team including the 2009 champion Linet Masai, the reigning 5000 metres world champion Vivian Cheruiyot, and Sally Kipyego – the fastest 10,000 m runner that year. The next strongest competitors were the Ethiopian women, which included the 2009 runner-up Meselech Melkamu and Meseret Defar. The United States was represented by 2007 World bronze medallist Kara Goucher and 2008 Olympic third placer Shalane Flanagan (who was the second fastest that year).

An American trio of Goucher, Flanagan and Jen Rhines set the pace in the initial stages of the competition. After around 3000 metres, the Kenyan and Ethiopian teams asserted themselves and it was only Flanagan and Shitaye Eshete who maintained the positions with them. The leading pack reached the halfway point in 15:47.04 minutes and the pace became increasingly quicker at this point – a fact which saw Tigist Kiros fall away from the pack. Flanagan and Eshete were the next to trail away, then Meseret Defar dropped out entirely with stomach pains, reducing the leading pack to the four Kenyans (Masai, Cheruiyot, Kipyego and Priscah Jepleting Cherono) and Meselech Melkamu. In the final lap, it was Cheruiyot and Kipyego who surged away into the lead. Cheruiyot held off her compatriot near the finish line to win the gold with a personal best of 30:48.98 minutes in what was only her third ever race over the distance. Kipyego took second, while Masai had a late run to take the bronze for a Kenyan sweep of the medals. Cherono was the fourth woman across the line and Meselech took fifth. Eshete ran a Bahraini record of 31:21.57 minutes for sixth.

Kenya became only the third country to have its athletes take positions one through four in an event (the other two being Ethiopia in the women's 5000 metres and the United States in the men's 200 metres, both at 2005 World Championships). The podium sweep was also unique in that it was the first time any nation had won all the medals on one day of the championships, as Kenyan women had taken all three medals in the women's marathon (the only other final of the first day).

Medalists

Records
Prior to the competition, the records were as follows:

Qualification standards

Schedule

Results

Final

References

External links
10,000 metres results at IAAF website

10000
10,000 metres at the World Athletics Championships
2011 in women's athletics